Stamford Baron St Martin was a civil parish in Stamford, England, including the southern part of Stamford, south of the River Welland, and therefore historically part of Northamptonshire.  It remains an ecclesiastical parish used by the Church of England; the parish church is St Martin's.

The Baron part of the name comes from the fact that the area was granted as a barony to the Abbot of Peterborough in the 15th century.

It expanded at an early stage to include Wothorpe, which was split out civilly in 1866.  The parish was divided again in 1889, under the Local Government Act 1888.  The area of the parish which was inside the boundary of the municipal borough of Stamford became considered part of Lincolnshire along with the rest of Stamford, and retained the name Stamford Baron St Martin, whilst the outer part became the parish of St Martin's Without remaining in the Soke of Peterborough associated with Northamptonshire.

The rump of civil parish was abolished in 1930 when all the Stamford civil parishes were merged to form one single Stamford parish (also taking in Stamford All Saints, Stamford St George, Stamford St John, Stamford St Mary, and Stamford St Michael).  St Martin's Without and Wothorpe still exist as civil parishes, now in the City of Peterborough unitary authority area of Cambridgeshire.

References

Youngs, Guide to the Local Administrative Units of England, Volume II

History of Lincolnshire
History of Cambridgeshire
Stamford, Lincolnshire